Raja Riaz Ahmad (born 26 July 1955) is a Pakistani politician who has been a member of the National Assembly of Pakistan since August 2018. Previously, he was the Punjab Minister for Irrigation and Power and was also the member of the Provincial Assembly of the Punjab between 1993 and 2013.
He has been leader of opposition in National Assembly of Pakistan since May 2022.

Early life and education
He was born on 26 July 1955 in Faisalabad, Punjab, Pakistan.

He graduated from Government College University and has the degree of Bachelor of Arts.

Political career
He was elected to the Provincial Assembly of the Punjab as a candidate of Pakistan Peoples Party (PPP) from Constituency PP-55 (Faisalabad-XIII) in 1993 Pakistani general election. He received 30,655 votes and defeated Qamar Uz Zaman Awan, a candidate of Pakistan Muslim League (N) (PML-N).

He ran for the seat of the Provincial Assembly of the Punjab as a candidate of PPP from Constituency PP-55 (Faisalabad-XIII) in 1997 Pakistani general election, but was unsuccessful. He received 18,950 votes and lost the seat to Rana Afzal Khan.

He was re-elected to the Provincial Assembly of the Punjab as a candidate of PPP from Constituency PP-65 (Faisalabad-XV) in 2002 Pakistani general election. He received 27,788 votes and defeated Muhammad Saqib Malik, a candidate of PML-N.

He was re-elected to the Provincial Assembly of the Punjab as a candidate of PPP from Constituency PP-65 (Faisalabad-XV) in 2008 Pakistani general election. He received 29,858 votes and defeated Haji Muhammad Shakeel Ansari, a candidate of PML-N. Following his successful election, he was inducted into the provincial Punjab cabinet of Chief Minister Shahbaz Sharif and was made Provincial Minister of Punjab for irrigation and power where he continued to serve until 2010.

He ran for the seat of the Provincial Assembly of the Punjab as a candidate of PPP from Constituency PP-65 (Faisalabad-XV) in 2013 Pakistani general election, but was unsuccessful. He received 17,571 votes and lost the seat to Muhammad Ilyas Ansari.

He joined Pakistan Tehreek-e-Insaf (PTI) in May 2016.

He was elected to the National Assembly of Pakistan as a candidate of PTI from Constituency NA-110 (Faisalabad-X) in 2018 Pakistani general election. securing 114,215 votes against his opponent PML-N candidate Mohammad Afzal Khan 108,172 votes.

On 27 September 2018, Prime Minister Imran Khan appointed him as Federal Parliamentary Secretary for Petroleum. He resigned this post in December 2018.

In March 2022, He was amongst 20 Member National Assembly, who dissidents from PTI and joined then opposition to pass a no-confidence motion against Prime Minister Imran Khan.  In April 2022, The National Assembly of Pakistan passed this motion securing 174 votes in favour. He has been appointed leader of opposition in National Assembly of Pakistan on 20 May 2022, as defunct group of PTI having 20 PTI members in National Assembly.

See also
 List of members of the 15th National Assembly of Pakistan

References

External links
  

Living people
1959 births
Punjabi people
Punjab MPAs 1993–1996
Punjab MPAs 2002–2007
Punjab MPAs 2008–2013
Pakistani MNAs 2018–2023
Pakistan People's Party MPAs (Punjab)
Pakistan Tehreek-e-Insaf MNAs
Provincial ministers of Punjab
Government College University Faisalabad alumni